Soa may refer to:

Places

Scotland 
Soa (near Coll), an island in the United Kingdom in Argyll and Bute
Soa, Tiree, a tidal island of Tiree, Argyll and Bute
Soa Island, an islet lying south of Iona, Argyll and Bute, Scotland

Elsewhere
Soa (Phrygia), a town of ancient Phrygia, now in Turkey
Soa, Cameroon, a town in Centre region
Soa Airport, in Bajawa, Indonesia
Søo, a river in Norway, also known as the Søa

Other uses
Soa (barklice), a genus in the family Lepidopsocidae
Soa Palelei (born 1977), Australian mixed martial artist
Soa de Muse, French drag queen

See also 

SOA (disambiguation)
 SOAS (disambiguation)